The Rotem EMU (also known as K-Train/K-Stock) is an electric multiple unit that operates on the MTR rapid transit railway system in Hong Kong. They were jointly built by a consortium consisting of Mitsubishi Heavy Industries of Japan and Hyundai Rotem of South Korea and come in two variants: TKE-C651 was delivered for the Tseung Kwan O line (used on the Kwun Tong line until 2009), and TKE-C6522-04E delivered in 2006 to 2007 for the Tung Chung line. In 2003 and 2004, the urban line trains ran on the Tsuen Wan line, Island line and Tseung Kwan O line.

The K-Stock trains are different from the R-stock trains built by Hyundai Rotem for the  East Rail line extension, which were ordered by MTRC on 14 December 2012, as 37 nine-car sets and entered service on the current East Rail line in 2021.

Details

Tseung Kwan O line stock 
The first of the 104 TKE-C651 cars entered service on 26 April 2002. Originally, these trains were designated to serve on the Tseung Kwan O line, but incompatible signalling apparatus installed in the new trains (running mode rather than the traditional automatic control system found in the M-stock) meant that all of the K-stock trains were initially unable to serve on the Tseung Kwan O line. As an alternative, all of those prototypes were ordered to serve on the Kwun Tong line. They have since been moved to the Tseung Kwan O line with the extension to LOHAS Park in 2009 and the subsequent arrival of the newer C-stock on the Kwun Tong line. Since the location of motor and trailer cars are different from the older M-Train, it does not have any cars similar to D cars in M-Train.

The K-Stock's exterior appearance is similar to the first trains used on Phase I of the Delhi Metro in India, which were also designed by Mitsubishi/Rotem, but built by BEML through a technology transfer arrangement.

The K-Stock trains came under criticism when they were first put into service due to delays and door safety issues. Along with other service reliability issues, there have been incidents where passengers have been injured by its doors, leading to the MTRCL "minimising the number of Korean trains for passenger service until a higher reliability of the systems concerned is achieved".

The configuration of a TKL K Stock train is (Eastbound) A-C-B-B-C-B-C-A (Westbound). This modern train is equipped with a modern 2-level IGBT–VVVF inverter from Mitsubishi Electric.

Tung Chung line stock 
The first TKE-C6522-04E train came into service for MTR on 12 June 2006 to 26 February 2007. Originally MTRC wanted to buy new additional trains for the Tung Chung line when the North Island line project began. MTR anticipated that the opening of the Disneyland Resort and Ngong Ping 360 would have an increase in passenger demand and therefore ordered four new trains for the Tung Chung line. The time frame from order to completion is short in comparison to other stock, however; the four new trains can only be made to be identical to existing Tseung Kwan O line K-Stock.

The configuration of a TCL K-Stock train is (Westbound) V-Z-X-Y-W-X-Z-V (Eastbound). This advanced train is equipped with a modern 2-level IGBT–VVVF inverter (model number: MAP-214-15VD143) from Mitsubishi Electric.

In popular culture
The train on the Tseung Kwan O line, appears in the film, Blackhat.

References

External links
 
  spec sheet

MTR rolling stock
Electric multiple units of Hong Kong
Hyundai Rotem multiple units
1500 V DC multiple units